Fyresdal is a municipality in Vestfold og Telemark county, Norway. It is located in the traditional district of Vest-Telemark. The administrative centre of the municipality is the village of Moland. Other villages in Fyresdal include Kilegrend, Øvre Birtedalen, and Øyane.

The  municipality is the 78th largest by area out of the 356 municipalities in Norway. Fyresdal is the 318th most populous municipality in Norway with a population of 1,198.

General information
The parish of Moland was established as a municipality on 1 January 1838 (see formannskapsdistrikt law). In 1879, the name of the municipality was changed to Fyresdal. The borders of the municipality have never changed, something which is pretty unusual in Norway.

Name
The municipality (originally the parish) is named after the old Moland farm since the first Moland Church was built there. This name was in use until 1879 when the municipal name was changed to Fyresdal, after the valley in which it is located. The first element of this name is the genitive case of the name of the local lake Fyresvatnet. The name of the lake is derived from the word  which means "pine tree".

Coat of arms
The coat of arms was granted on 24 April 1992. The official blazon is "Vert two bendwise axes argent in pale". This means the arms have a green field (background) and the charge is a broadaxe. The broadaxes have a tincture of argent which means it is colored white most of the time, but if it is made out of metal, then silver is used. The green color in the field and the broadaxe were chosen to symbolize the importance of forestry in the municipality. The arms were the result of a local competition, which resulted in 42 different proposals being submitted. The winning design for the arms was submitted by Halvor Holtskog Jr.

Churches
The Church of Norway has one parish within the municipality of Fyresdal. It is part of the Øvre Telemark prosti (deanery) in the Diocese of Agder og Telemark.

History
Fyresdal is known for its many findings from the Viking Age, its mighty Viking graves, heaps of slag, and the former Heggland pilgrim church that once stood proudly north of the village centre. People traveled to this church from all over Norway and even from Europe. It was said that the stream running behind the church had healing powers.

A few miles south of the site where the Heggland Pilgrim Church, once stood at Molandsmoen, a stone with Runic inscriptions can be found.  This is a reminder from the Viking Age when horse battles were held there. Originally, one believes, there were four of them.  
Klokkarhamaren is a little mountain on a peninsula in the municipal centre, and it is the location of a cave called Munkhola.  It is believed that a certain number of monks in medieval times resided, held masses, and sought refuge here.

Government
All municipalities in Norway, including Fyresdal, are responsible for primary education (through 10th grade), outpatient health services, senior citizen services, welfare and other social services, zoning, economic development, and municipal roads and utilities. The municipality is governed by a municipal council of elected representatives, which in turn elect a mayor.

Municipal council
The municipal council  of Fyresdal is made up of representatives that are elected to four year terms. The party breakdown of the municipal council is as follows:

Mayor
The mayors of Fyresdal (incomplete list):
1999-2007: Saamund Gjersund (LL)
2007-2011: Bjørn Fredrik Nome (Sp)
2011–present: Erik Skjervagen (Ap)

Economy
Most people in the municipality work in the fields of agriculture, forestry, trade, industry, and tourism. There are not many full-time farmers left in Fyresdal, but many people derive a secondary income from agriculture and forestry.

The largest employer in the municipality is Telemark Kildevann which makes bottled water and soft drinks for the national and Swedish markets. There are also a few small high-competence mechanical factories which produce parts for the offshore industry.

Transportation

The Vest-Telemark airport, Fyresdal is located in Moland, with a nearby hotel. This is a joint operation under the name Airparc Fyresdal. Fyresdal has bus connections with the town centres of Skien and Porsgrunn in Telemark county; Arendal in Agder county; Bergen in Vestland county; Haugesund in Rogaland county; and to the capital, Oslo. A bus also travels every school day of the year between Fyresdal and Dalen, the municipal centre of the neighboring Tokke Municipality.

Geography
The municipality of Fyresdal consists of several little villages north of Moland, in the main valley of Fyresdal, and on the western and southeastern shores of Fyresvatnet, one of Norway's deepest lakes. Moland is the location of the municipal council, the school, the community house, kindergartens, the home for the elderly, and most of the commercial enterprises in the municipality. Moland is the most heavily populated aea of Fyresdal.

Fyresdal is among the westernmost municipalities in Telemark. It borders the municipalities of Tokke, Kviteseid, and Nissedal in Telemark county. It also shares borders with the municipalities of Åmli, Bygland, and Valle in Agder county.

Village areas in Fyresdal municipality

Geitstadgrend
Spockeligrend
Momrak
Sitje
Tøddebakkane
Folkestadbyen
Øvre Birtedalen
Nedre Birtedalen
Fardal
Breivik
Hegglandsgrend
Grunnvik
Moland
Veum
Hauggrend
Liegrend
Fjellgardane
Kilegrend

Attractions
One of Fyresdal's two churches (Moland Church) and the vicarage (Fyresdal Prestegard) are located in Moland. According to Telemark folklore, the Troll of Røykjenes moved across the lake because the bells of the Moland Church were disturbing its nap. The vicarage is where Vidkun Quisling was born.
Within the administrative center of Moland, one also finds the old village centre, Folkestadbyen. Folkestadbyen is the location of the Fyresdal Vertshus, a Swiss-styled dwelling built in 1890. It has housed and served both food and drinks to locals and travellers for over 100 years. Øyskogen park, which contains Viking graves and a lot of traditional Telemark houses (e.g. lofts and stabburs) is also part of the old village. The Fyresdal Bygdemuseum, the village museum, is also located in Øyskogen. 
Fv 355 runs straight through the municipality from north to south. Hegglandsgrend, Veum, and Hauggrend are villages along Fv 355 located north of Moland. Hegglandsgrend is the home of Heggland Gamle Kyrkjegard; Veum is the home of Veum Church. A Rudolf Steiner School (an upper secondary level school) was located at Foldsæ in Hauggrend. This  so-called friskole ("Free school") based on the thoughts and ideas of Rudolf Steiner was however closed down after few years. In Hauggrend, one also finds the most distinct mountain in Fyresdal, Roan.
North of Moland, to the west from the main valley we find the little settlements of Kleivgrend, Åslandsgrend. Turning left of the Fv 355 in Hegglandsgrend, one comes to Kleivgrend and Åslandsgrend. Between Kleivgrend and the neighbouring municipality Valle on the western side of the mountains, one finds an old track that priests and bishops used to get between the counties of Agder and Telemark. This track is named Bispevegen ("Bishop's Road") and every year a march called Bispevegmarsjen ("The Bishop's Road March") starts in Kleivgrend. In Fjellgardane, Germans ran mines in the 16th century at Moisesberg.
On the western shores of the lake Fyresvatnet, to the southwest of Moland, one finds the villages of Fardal, Breivik. Here one finds an old and interesting stone called Røykjenessteinen. In 2005, one also found some arrowheads in this area that are believed to be 4000–4500 years old. Farther along the country road we find Øvre Birtedalen, a popular place for people to have mountain cabins.
South of Moland, at the southern end of Fv 355 across the scenic and mighty mountain of Våmur where one can see the lake from up above, one comes to the little village of Kilegrend. In the old days, there was no road connecting Kilegrend with the municipal centre. Thus one had to travel by boat. For years the steamboats called Teisner and Fyresdølen travelled between Moland and Kilegrend. The latter eventually capsized and sank. The wreck is still visible in Kilegrend.

Notable people

 Petter Veum, (Norwegian Wiki) (1811 in Fyresdal - 1889), a fiddler
 Jon Lauritz Qvisling, (Norwegian Wiki) (1844 in Fyresdal - 1930), a clergyman, author and genealogist
 John Lie, (Norwegian Wiki) (1846 in Fyresdal - 1916), an author 
 Ivar Peterson Tveiten (1850 in Fyresdal – 1934), a Norwegian teacher and politician
 Torgeir Vraa (1868 in Fyresdal – 1934), a Norwegian educator, newspaper editor and politician
 Haakon Lie (1884 in Fyresdal – 1970), a Norwegian forester, novelist, poet and children's writer
 Vidkun Quisling (1887 in Fyresdal – 1945), a Norwegian military officer, politician, Nazi collaborator & traitor
 Frode Rui, (Norwegian Wiki) (born 1969 im Fyresdal), a Norwegian weightlifter
 Sugar Plum Fairies (formed 2000 in Fyresdal – 2009), a folk and pop band

References

External links

Municipal fact sheet from Statistics Norway 

 
Municipalities of Vestfold og Telemark
1838 establishments in Norway